Campina Grande do Sul, Paraná is a municipality located in the Brazilian state of Paraná. Its population was 43,685 (2020) and its area is 539.861 km².

The municipality contains 10% of the  Roberto Ribas Lange State Park, created in 1994.
It contains part of the  Pico Paraná State Park, created in 2002.

References

Municipalities in Paraná